Basil Athanasiadis (Greek: Βασίλης Αθανασιάδης, born 1970) is a Greek composer based in the United Kingdom.

Biography
Athanasiadis, after completing his piano and advanced theory studies (harmony, counterpoint, fugue) at the National Conservatoire of Athens, moved to London, England. He studied composition at the Trinity College of Music with Daryl Runswick, the Royal Academy of Music with Paul Patterson, and finally at the Canterbury Christ Church University where he obtained his PhD under the supervision of Roderick Watkins and Paul Patterson supported by the Research Studentship Award.

In 2010, Athanasiadis was the recipient of the JSPS Postdoctoral Fellowship Award (2010–11). Based at the Tokyo University of the Arts as a Special Foreign Researcher, he composed new works for Western and Japanese instruments with a particular interest on the shō (mouth organ) and the 20-stringed koto. Some of those works were presented in a series of concerts culminating to a large-scale performance project that took place at the Sogakudo Hall on 23 January 2011. The same year he was awarded the JSPS Postdoctoral Fellowship Award (2011–13) for the second time to further his research and support the composition of new works for Japanese and Western instruments and their performance in both Japan and Europe.

Athanasiadis' works are characterised by a strong visual identity; his performances has often been accompanied by dance or stage action. Early influences can be traced in Sergiu Celibidache's views on aspects of ambience and acoustic space (Athanasiadis attended Celibidache's Munich seminars in 1994), and in composers such as Christou, Feldman and Takemitsu. His most recent works focus on the Japanese aesthetic of wabi-sabi, which has also been the main subject of his doctoral and postdoctoral research since 2004.

Athanasiadis's music has been published by Oxford University Press and United Music Publishers and selected works have been released on CD by Dutton Epoch, Sargasso Records, Regent Records, Fonorum and the Choir & Organ magazine (cover CD for March/April 2009 issue).

Performances
Basil Athanasiadis's works have been performed in Europe, US, Canada and Asia by ensembles such as the London Sinfonietta, Amsterdam Loeki Stardust Quartet, New London Chamber Ensemble, Silk String Quartet, Okeanos, Mondriaan Quartet, Alea III, Shonorities and choirs such as the BBC Singers, Wells Cathedral Choir, Cambridge Chapel Choir of Selwyn College, Montreal Christ Church Cathedral Choir.

Selected works
Athanasiadis's compositions include the following:

 This Leaf is Selected (2003) for flute, oboe, clarinet, piano, violin and cello
 Anammisis (2003) for solo piano
 Knots II (2003) for violin and organ
 Terpsichore Bemused (2004) for two pianos
 Faded Shonoriites (2005) for wind quintet
 Little Songs of the Geisha (2006) for female voice, flute, violin and cello
 Ithaka (2006) for sho, shakuhachi, samisen, koto, harp, oboe d'amore, clarinet and viola
 Antiphon to Mary (2006) for choir and organ
 Faded Shonorities II (2007) for alto saxophone and marimba
 Jardin d'Iris (2009) for female voice, violin and electronics
 Dance of the Seven Veils (2010) for percussion trio
 Interrupted Dreams (2010) for sho and 20-stringed koto
 Clouds that I Like (2011 Sargasso Records) for female voice, sho, 20-stringed koto and string trio

References

External links
 Basil Athanasiadis website
Pictures and music samples from Shonorities' website
Music video samples

1970 births
Living people
People from Pieria (regional unit)
Alumni of Trinity College of Music
Alumni of Canterbury Christ Church University
Alumni of the Royal Academy of Music
Greek expatriates in Japan
21st-century classical composers
Greek classical composers
Male classical composers
21st-century male musicians